3rd Saeima was the parliament of Latvia from 6 November 1928 until 2 November 1931. Social Democrat Pauls Kalniņš continued to hold the post of Speaker of the Saeima to which he was first elected during the 1st Saeima.

3rd Saeima gave confidence to the 2nd cabinet of Hugo Celmiņš (1 December 1928 – 26 March 1931), and the 3rd cabinet of Kārlis Ulmanis (27 March 1931 – 5 December 1931).

Elections and parties
3rd Saeima elections were held on 6-7 October 1928 and 79.35% of eligible voters participated. Due to the liberal Elections law, 27 parties and candidates lists were elected to the 100 seats, representing all the political and ethnic interest groups of Latvia.  
Social Democrats – 25 seats
Latvian Farmers’ Union – 16 seats
Committee of the German Baltic Parties – 6 seats
Latgalian Christian Peasant and Catholic Party – 6 seats
Workers and Peasants Party – 6 seats
Christian Union and Workers Party – 4 seats
New Farmers-Small Landowners Party – 4 seats
 Democratic Centre and Independents union - 3 seats
Latgalian Democratic Peasant Party – 3 seats
Progressive People’s Union – 3 seats
Union of Social Democrats – Mensheviks and Rural Workers, New Farmers and Craftsmen – 2 seats
United Old Believers list – 2 seats
 – 2 seats
Latgalian Independent Socialist Party – 2 seats
National Union – 2 seats
Russian district and activist united list – 2 seats
Russian Orthodox and Old Believers voters and united Russian organizations list – 2 seats
Polish-Catholic Latvian Union of Poles – 2 seats
Lost money deposits and other victims Party – 1 seat
Agudas Israel– 1 seat
Christian Working Peoples Union – 1 seat
Union of Latgalian Latvians and land plowers Party – 1 seat
Latgalian Social Democratic Workers Party – 1 seat
Labour League of Latvia – 1 seat
Peace, order and production Union – 1 seat
Ceire Cion – 1 seat
Latvia’s Jewish socialdemocratic workers party Bund – 1 seat

Political history of Latvia
Saeima